Maria Ioana Constantin (born 5 January 2001) is a Romanian alpine skier. She competed at the 2022 Winter Olympics, in Women's slalom, and  Women's giant slalom.

She competed at the 2021 FIS World Ski Championships at Cortina d'Ampezzo and FIS Junior World Ski Championship.

References

External links 

 Romania Maria Constantin (79) during Womens Slalom at National Alpine Ski Centre.

2001 births
Living people
Romanian female alpine skiers
Alpine skiers at the 2022 Winter Olympics
Olympic alpine skiers of Romania